"Honky Tonk America" is a song recorded by American country music artist Sammy Kershaw.  It was released in June 1998 as the third single from the album Labor of Love.  The song reached #31 on the Billboard Hot Country Singles & Tracks chart.  The song was written by Bob McDill.

Chart performance

References

1998 singles
1997 songs
Sammy Kershaw songs
Songs written by Bob McDill
Song recordings produced by Keith Stegall
Mercury Records singles